"The Slump" is the third episode of the first season of the American television police sitcom series Brooklyn Nine-Nine. It is the 3rd overall episode of the series and is written by co-producer Prentice Penny and directed by Julie Anne Robinson. It aired on Fox in the United States on October 1, 2013.

The show revolves around the fictitious 99th precinct of the New York Police Department in Brooklyn and the officers and detectives that work in the precinct. Jake Peralta (Andy Samberg) is an immature yet very talented detective in the precinct with an astounding record of crimes solved, putting him in a competition with fellow detective Amy Santiago (Melissa Fumero). The precinct's status changes when the Captain is retiring and a new commanding officer, Cpt. Raymond Holt (Andre Braugher) is appointed as the newest Captain. This puts a conflict between Jake and Holt for their respective methods in the field.

The episode was seen by an estimated 3.43 million household viewers and gained a 1.4/4 ratings share among adults aged 18–49, according to Nielsen Media Research. The episode received positive reviews from critics, who praised the cast's performance but some felt mixed with the episode's plot.

Plot
Jake (Andy Samberg) has a lot of unsolved cases on his plate, and the other detectives are unwilling to let his losing streak rub off on them. Meanwhile, Amy (Melissa Fumero) recruits Rosa (Stephanie Beatriz) and Gina (Chelsea Peretti) for help when Holt (Andre Braugher) asks her to run lead on the Junior Policeman Program for at-risk youth, and Boyle (Joe Lo Truglio) helps Jeffords (Terry Crews) with a special case he's unable to solve.

Reception

Viewers
In its original American broadcast, "The Slump" was seen by an estimated 3.43 million household viewers and gained a 1.4/4 ratings share among adults aged 18–49, according to Nielsen Media Research. This was a 15% decrease in viewership from the previous episode, which was watched by 4.03 million viewers with a 1.8/5 in the 18-49 demographics. This means that 1.4 percent of all households with televisions watched the episode, while 4 percent of all households watching television at that time watched it. With these ratings, Brooklyn Nine-Nine was the third most watched show on FOX for the night, beating Dads but behind The Mindy Project, and New Girl, fourth on its timeslot and eleventh for the night in the 18-49 demographics, behind Trophy Wife, The Mindy Project, New Girl, Person of Interest, The Goldbergs, Chicago Fire, NCIS: Los Angeles, Agents of S.H.I.E.L.D., NCIS, and The Voice.

Critical reviews
"The Slump" received positive reviews from critics. Roth Cornet of IGN gave the episode a "good" 7.7 out of 10 and wrote, "Brooklyn Nine-Nine continues to deliver laughs and tightly constructed episodes. As the weeks progress, and we get to know these characters, I find myself enjoying them, and the series, more and more. Though I will say that I hope to see a bit more in the way of in-depth character development, in as much as 'in-depth character development' is appropriate for a comedy such as this. Which is to say, it would be nice to see Peralta and crew evolve into fully fleshed out, if wacky, humans, rather than sketches acting out similar shticks week after week. Having said that, these are pretty entertaining shticks thus far! And it does take time for things to gel in a show's first season."

Molly Eichel of The A.V. Club gave the episode a "B+" grade and wrote, "Other characters are starting to become more fully-formed as well. Boyle is a divorcé, Diaz came from the streets and Santiago didn't. While Peralta may have been thrown off his game early on, the other characters are beginning to become fully-formed beyond the traits that are introduced in the pilot. I'm pumped to see them evolve even more."

Aaron Channon of Paste gave the episode a 7.9 out of 10 and wrote, "'The Slump' is Brooklyn Nine-Nines best episode yet: The laughs finally matched the talent, and the characters are growing at a satisfying pace."

References

External links

2013 American television episodes
Brooklyn Nine-Nine (season 1) episodes